Vented balance safety enclosures are used in pharmaceutical, chemical, biological, and toxicological laboratories to provide maximum containment for weighing operations in weighing scales.

Fume hoods, also known as laboratory chemical hoods, are one of the most important and widely used engineering controls to protect workers in laboratories. Fume hoods were introduced about 100 years ago to safeguard personnel working with hazardous materials. While many changes and improvements have been made, the basic concept and design of fume hoods remains the same. Air is drawn from the workplace, around the worker and into the front of the hood, and is then exhausted out of the laboratory.  Most laboratory hoods are described as constant air volume (CAV) hoods because they draw a constant amount of air at all times. Rising energy costs have made these hoods exceptionally expensive to operate. For example, a single six-foot hood operating 24/7/365 costs over $5,000/year to operate. In addition, CAV hoods do not react rapidly to airflow disturbances (turbulence) within the hood or within the laboratory and, hence, their sole purpose of containment and protection can be seriously compromised.

To optimize the effectiveness of properly designed hoods:

 Maximize capture and containment of hazardous materials
 Use ergonomic design to enable easy use
 Conform to high performance standards
 Minimize energy consumption
 Ensure flexibility to permit quick and easy relocation

The control of hazards is more than simply enclosing the problem. What are important are how well the ventilated areas contain the hazards and suitability of the workstations for the specific tasks being performed.

References

Safety equipment
Ventilation